Streptomyces lilacinus is a bacterium species from the genus of Streptomyces which has been from soil.

See also 
 List of Streptomyces species

References

Further reading

External links
Type strain of Streptomyces lilacinus at BacDive -  the Bacterial Diversity Metadatabase	

lilacinus
Bacteria described in 1991